Stenelmis cheryl, or Cheryl's riffle beetle, is a species of riffle beetle in the family Elmidae. It is found in Central America and North America.

References

Further reading

 
 
 
 

Elmidae
Articles created by Qbugbot
Beetles described in 1987